Soldiers Three is a 1951 American adventure film based upon an element of several short stories by Rudyard Kipling featuring the same trio of British soldiers, portrayed in the film by Stewart Granger, Robert Newton, and Cyril Cusack. The picture was directed by Tay Garnett.

Plot
London, 1918: In a gentlemen's club, General Brunswick regales junior officers celebrating a British advance in France with the tale of how he won his brigade command during his service in India, not with gallantry under fire but under circumstances that warranted a court martial.

As the longtime colonel of 1st Battalion, the Rutlandshire Regiment, an infantry unit, Brunswick had a trusted aide, Capt. Pindenny, and the service of three able but not always reliable privates, Ackroyd, Malloy and Sykes, who for his eighteen years as commander were "the Queen's hard bargain", sneaking off to drink, fight and gamble whenever they could. Against their wishes, one man must be elevated to sergeant to separate them and Ackroyd is the unhappy choice. Sent from their garrison at Hyderalipore to provide a show of force at a reported disturbance in Mirzabad, Brunswick and his battalion are recalled and placed under rival Colonel Groat of the 28th Hussars and his officious adjutant, Major Mercer.

A rift develops between the three friends after Ackroyd's promotion, but it is mended after he saves Sykes' life. Sykes and Malloy become part of a small force under Mercer and Pindenny to an abandoned fort at Imara as a sacrificial lure to entrap the insurgent forces of Manik Rao. Ackroyd is left behind and apparently becomes a deserter. Groat separates his command and Brunswick uses it as an opportunity to ignore Groat's order to return to his garrison post and take his battalion to Imara.

At Imara the fort is attacked by Manik Rao and overrun, with the British survivors taking refuge in its powder house. Manik Rao threatens to blow them up if they do not surrender. Ackroyd enters the fort in disguise, slays Manik Rao, and saves the lives of the trapped British troops. Brunswick expects to be court-martialed but finds he was goaded by Groat into acting as he did to avoid officially starting a war. Groat "suggests" that Brunswick led his command in pursuit of the deserter Ackroyd and Brunswick is promoted instead. Ackroyd's "punishment" for desertion, on the other hand, is to be demoted back to private as he wished.

Cast
 Stewart Granger as Archibald Ackroyd 
 Walter Pidgeon as Colonel Brunswick
 David Niven as Captain Pindenny
 Robert Newton as Bill Sykes
 Cyril Cusack as Dennis Malloy
 Greta Gynt as Crenshaw
 Robert Coote as Major Mercer
 Dan O'Herlihy as Sergeant Murphy
 Michael Ansara as Manik Rao
 Movita Castaneda as cabaret girl

Production

Development
In 1934, it was announced that Gaumont British would make a film based on Soldiers Three. A film crew was sent to India under Geoffrey Barkas to shoot second unit footage. A script had been written based on "The Courting of Dinah Shadd" and Lung Tung Pen" and involve a climax especially written by Kipling involving a battle at the Khyber Pass. The battle was shot with army cooperation.

Michael Balcon of Gaumont then set about trying to secure a cast. He visited Hollywood and said he was interested in Pat O'Brien to play the lead. Then Richard Dix, Maureen O'Sullivan and C. Aubrey Smith were all mentioned as possible stars. Gordon Harker was also announced as a lead.

Smith actually travelled to England to make the movie, but wound up appearing in Trans-Atlantic Tunnel instead. Soldiers Three was postponed.

Gaumont still insisted they would make the film and announced that Victor McLaglen would star and Raoul Walsh direct. Walsh said he was interested in making two versions, one for England and one for America – the latter without the British dialect. Walsh left for England to begin pre-production and Charles Bickford was announced as co-star.

However, Gaumont never made the film. In early 1938, MGM announced they were going to make the film along with another Kipling adaptation, Kim. A script was written by Vincent Lawrence and Grover Jones. However shooting was postponed out of sensitivity to Indian audiences.

The project was reactivated after the war and the script was rewritten by Marguerite Roberts. The producer was Pandro S. Berman, who had worked on Gunga Din. It was one of two Kipling-orientated films being made by the studio at the time, the other being Kim.

In May 1950, it was announced the movie would be one of the first starring Stewart Granger under his new seven-year contract with MGM following the success of King Solomon's Mines – the others were a remake of Scaramouche and Robinson Crusoe. The latter film was never made.

The initial cast was to be Granger, Gene Kelly and Walter Pidgeon. Granger was to play Irishman Terence Mulvaney, with the other lead characters called Ortheris and Learoyd. Tay Garnett signed to direct. Eventually Kelly dropped out and David Niven and Cyril Cusack signed on to star. Greta Gynt was given her first role in American films as the female lead.

The bulk of the story was taken from Kipling's "The Incarnation of Krishna Mulvaney". Pandro S. Berman told the New York Times he was aware the story was politically tricky:
We are making a rough and tumble brawling comedy with three British soldiers out of a Kipling work as major characters and that presents major problems. The people of India hated Kipling. As to the British, how they will react when we show three roistering, drunken Tommies on the screen is a question. When I produced Gunga Din at RKO in 1938 it was banned in India and efforts were made to stop it being shown in the British Isles. But if we were to film Soldiers Three to please either Britain or India we would have to make it much too dull to for our much bigger audience here at home.

Nonetheless Berman insisted on the creation of a new character, Gobind Lal, a peaceful Indian, who was not in the Kipling original, although care was taken that Lal did not resemble Mahatma Gandhi too closely. The final scene was altered so that Indian rebels laid down their arms to indicate their support of passive resistance. Berman also arranged for Mulvaney's irreverence to the Hindu god Krishna to be removed so as not to offend Indians.

Further changes were made when it was realised that Granger could not do an Irish accent – the character of Mulvaney was changed to the Cockney "Ackroyd" (Granger could do Cockney). Once this change was made, Berman decided that the other two lead characters should also have their names changed, to Malloy and Sykes, to emphasise that the work was more of an MGM original than derived from Kipling.

Filming started October 1950. During the filming of a barroom brawl scene, a balcony collapsed and two stunt men were hospitalised.

Tay Garnett later wrote:
[The cast and story] should have made a good picture, but the miscasting of one principal, which I failed to recognize until it was too late, threw the show completely out of balance. Trying to restore equilibrium with jokes and gags was like trying to cure bubonic plague with warm beer.
Stewart Granger later said he enjoyed working with stuntman Yakima Canutt on the film, "but the script. Oh dear! If Metro had planned to ruin my career they couldn't have chosen a better subject."

Reception
According to MGM records the movie earned $1,016,000 in the US and Canada and $1,221,000 overseas, making a profit of $23,000.

It recorded admissions of 1,148,803 in France.

References

External links

 
 Soldier's Three at TCMDB
 
 

1951 films
1950s historical adventure films
American black-and-white films
American historical adventure films
British Empire war films
1950s English-language films
Films based on works by Rudyard Kipling
Films directed by Tay Garnett
Films scored by Adolph Deutsch
Films set in India
Films set in London
Films set in the 1880s
Films set in the 1910s
Films set in the British Raj
Films shot in California
Films shot in Utah
Metro-Goldwyn-Mayer films
1950s American films